, is a Japanese anime television series animated by Toei Animation. It aired in Japan from October 5, 2006 to December 21, 2006. A light novel by Hitomi Amamiya and illustrations by Hisashi Hirai was serialized in the MediaWorks magazine Dengeki Maoh in November 2006.

Plot
The story takes place during a fictional future, in the year 3567. During this time, a supernatural barrier called the Olynssis barrier, which disrupts space and time, envelops all of Earth. The planet is also being overrun by organic bug-like machines called Gardeners, which seek to exterminate all humans in order to "save and preserve" the planet. Tokito Aizawa is part of a group of hunters who destroys Gardeners and sells the scraps using mecha called Crawlers. Although, after encountering a girl named Tea, who constantly calls him "Koichi", and her giant machine, Silver, his life becomes more complicated.

Media
The series began broadcast on the Japanese television network Asahi Broadcasting Corporation (ABC) on October 5, 2006. It is directed by Katsumi Tokoro and produced by Toei Animation. Other networks such as Tokyo MX TV and Chiba TV also aired the episodes at later dates. A total of twelve episodes aired, with the last airing on December 21, 2006.

The anime was compiled into six DVD volumes; the limited edition, director's cut editions of the volumes had consecutive monthly releases in 2007. A box set containing all the volumes was released on January 21, 2007.

Episode list

Music
Two pieces of theme music are used for the anime episodes; one opening theme and one ending theme. The opening theme is "destiny" by CHiYo, while the ending theme is "Saraba Seishun no Hibi" by the Inazuma Sentai. CHiYo released a single for "destiny" on November 20, 2006, which is the seventh single she has released since her debut.

Staff
Director: Katsumi Tokoro
Series Composition, Scenario: Yuichiro Takeda
Character Design: Hisashi Hirai
Chief Character Animation Director: Hideaki Maniwa
Olynssis Mechanical Design: Yoshikazu Miyao, Hitoshi Fukuchi
Guest Mechanical Design, Chief Mecha Animation Director: Masahiro Shimanuki
Art director: Takashi Yoshiike
Colour Design: Tsutomu Tsukada
Music: Yugo Kanno
Planning Collaboration: Hitomi Amemiya, Dengeki Maoh
Production: Gin-iro no Olynssis Production Committee(Asahi Broadcasting, Nagoya TV, Happinet, Toei Animation)

References

External links
Toei Animation official Gin'iro no Olynssis site 

2006 Japanese novels
Anime and manga based on light novels
Dengeki Bunko
Kadokawa Dwango franchises
Light novels
Novels first published in serial form
Toei Animation television
Works originally published in Japanese magazines
Mecha anime and manga